Steve Belles (born November 21, 1966) is a former American football quarterback with the Arizona Rattlers of the Arena Football League (AFL). He subsequently became a high school football coach in Arizona, amassing five state championships at Hamilton High School in Chandler.

Playing career
Belles attended St. Mary's High School in Phoenix, where in 1984 he won a state championship and was named Arizona High School Player of the Year. He played college football at the University of Notre Dame.

After college he played one season with the Arizona Rattlers of the Arena Football League.

Coaching career 
Belles has been a head coach at three Arizona high schools: Desert Mountain High School in Scottsdale, Mountain Ridge High School in Glendale, and most recently Hamilton High School in Chandler. He was at Desert Mountain from 1995 to 2000 with a 26-25 record. At Mountain Ridge, where he was head coach from 2000 to 2006 with a 47-13 record, his team advanced to the state finals in 2004 against his future team, Hamilton High School, losing 37–7.

Belles became the head football coach at Hamilton in 2006 after John Wrenn left to become Arizona State University's running backs coach. He was instantly successful there with a 13–1 record, Fiesta Region Title, and an Arizona State Championship in his first season. Belles amassed a 131–18 record as coach, including five State Championships at Hamilton, and Arizona's big school state record 53-game win streak. During his tenure, Hamilton was ranked as high as fourth in the nation by the USA Today Super 25. As a head coach, Belles has a 204–56 record.

As a result of a hazing scandal at Hamilton becoming public in 2017, Chandler Unified School District suspended Belles as coach before the start of the football season. He remained at the school as a teacher until September, when he was reassigned to the district offices, and in December the head coach position was advertised with the Arizona Interscholastic Association.

On June 25, 2018, Belles announced he would become an assistant coach at Juan Diego Catholic High School in Draper, Utah responsible for the quarterbacks and defensive back positions.

References

External links
Just Sports Stats
College stats

Living people
1966 births
American football quarterbacks
Notre Dame Fighting Irish football players
Arizona Rattlers players
Arizona Rattlers coaches
High school football coaches in Arizona
Sportspeople from Phoenix, Arizona
Players of American football from Phoenix, Arizona